Professor Lena Barbara Kolarska-Bobińska (born 3 December 1947 in Prague) is a Polish sociologist, academic and political figure. Most recently, she served as the Polish Minister of Science and Higher Education from 2013 to 2015.
In order to take the appointment, she resigned as a Member of the European Parliament (MEP), where she represented the Lublin region from the Civic Platform Party list from 2009.

She is a graduate of the Sociology Department of the University of Warsaw, as well as a post-doctoral fellow at Stanford University and the Business School of Carnegie Mellon University. She also holds a Doctorate (dr. hab.)(1974) and the title of Professor from the Institute of Philosophy and Sociology, Polish Academy of Sciences, where she was head of the Department of Economics and Politics until 1991. From 1991 to 1997 she was director of CBOS, Poland's largest public opinion research centre. From 1997 until July 2009, she has been the director of the Institute of Public Affairs, Poland, an independent, non-partisan public policy think tank, stepping down upon her election to the European Parliament.

Kolarska-Bobińska has written over 300 books and articles. She has been a lecturer at universities in Poland and abroad. She often comments on political and social developments for Polish and international media. She is a regular columnist for the Polish newspaper "Gazeta Wyborcza" and was until 2009, a regular columnist for the French journal Les Échos.

Kolarska-Bobińska is a member of many Polish and international associations and advisory boards. She was a member of the Economic Council of President Lech Wałęsa (1992–1995), adviser of the Chief Negotiator for Poland's accession to the EU (1998–2001), and a member of President Aleksander Kwaśniewski's Reflection Group (2001–2005). Lena Kolarska-Bobinskla endorses the idea of a Federal Europe by signing the manifesto of the Spinelli Group.

She is married to Krzysztof Bobiński who is the president of Unia & Polska, a pro-European think-tank in Warsaw and former Warsaw correspondent of the Financial Times (1976–2000). They have two children. She is fluent in Polish, English and Spanish.

Honours
List of National Honours:
 Knight's Cross of the Order of Poland Reborn awarded by the Polish President (1997).
 Officer's Cross of the Order of Poland Reborn awarded by the Polish President (2004).
 European Medal awarded by the European Integration Committee and the Business Centre Club (2004).
 'Ordre National du Mérite' awarded by the President of the French Republic (2005)

Publications (selected)
 Centralization and Decentralization: Decisions, Power, Myth, Ossolineum, 1984.
 Aspirations, Values and Interests. Poland 1989–94, Instytut Filozofii i Socjologii PAN, 1994.
 Cztery reformy. Od koncepcji do realizacji (red., współautor), ISP, 2000.
 Polacy wobec wielkiej zmiany. Integracja z Unią Europejską (red., współautor), ISP, 2001.
 Obraz Polski i Polaków w Europie (red., współautor), ISP, 2003.
 Przed referendum europejskim, absencja, sprzeciw, poparcie (red., współautor), ISP, 2003.
 Świadomość ekonomiczna społeczeństwa i wizerunek biznesu (red., współautor), ISP, 2004.

External links

 European Parliament
 Personal Website
 Institute of Public Affairs

1947 births
Civic Platform MEPs
Women MEPs for Poland
Education ministers of Poland
Knights of the Order of Polonia Restituta
Living people
MEPs for Poland 2009–2014
Officers of the Order of Polonia Restituta
Recipients of the Ordre national du Mérite
Members of the Polish Academy of Sciences
Polish journalists
Polish women journalists
Polish sociologists
Women government ministers of Poland
Polish women academics